Dr. Robert Freedman (Robert Owen Freedman) is an American political scientist who holds appointments at Baltimore Hebrew University and at the Johns Hopkins University.

Freedman received his BA in Diplomatic History from  the University of Pennsylvania and his MA and Ph.D degrees in International Relations from Columbia University.

Books

 Soviet Policy Toward the Middle East Since 1970,  third edition,  Praeger Press  in 1982
  Moscow and the Middle East: Soviet Policy Since the Invasion of Afghanistan,  Cambridge University Press,  1991
  Soviet-Israeli Relations Under Gorbachev,  Praeger, 1991.
 The Intifada: Its Impact on Israel, the Arab World, and the Superpowers,  University Press of Florida, 1991
 The Middle East after Iraq's Invasion of Kuwait, University Press of Florida, 1993
 Israel in the Begin Era (1982) (edited)
  Israel Under Rabin  (1995)(edited)
  The Middle East and the Peace Process  (1998) (edited)
 Israel's First Fifty Years  (2000)  (edited)
  The Middle East Enters the 21st Century  (2002) (edited)

References

University of Pennsylvania School of Arts and Sciences alumni
School of International and Public Affairs, Columbia University alumni
Living people
Year of birth missing (living people)
American political scientists